This is a list of American films released in 1968.

Oliver! won the Academy Award for Best Picture.

Top-grossing films

 2001: A Space Odyssey
 Funny Girl
 Planet of the Apes
 Rosemary's Baby
 The Odd Couple
 Chitty Chitty Bang Bang
 The Thomas Crown Affair
 Ice Station Zebra
 The Night They Raided Minsky's

A-C

D-M

N-R

S-Z

Documentaries and other films

See also
 1968 in the United States

External links

1968 films at the Internet Movie Database
List of 1968 box office number-one films in the United States

1968
Films
Lists of 1968 films by country or language